Yuriy Petrovych Panchenko (born 5 February 1959) is a Ukrainian former volleyball player who competed for the Soviet Union in the 1980 Summer Olympics and in the 1988 Summer Olympics.

Biography
Born at Kiev, he debuted for Lokomotiv Kiev and, aged twenty, he moved to Soviet Union's most renowned team, VC CSKA Moscow: with this team he won  9 Soviet championships, 3 Soviet Cups, 6 European Champions Cups (1982, 1983, 1986, 1987, 1988, 1989) and two European Supercups (1987 and 1988). In 1980 he was part of the Soviet team which won the gold medal in the Olympic tournament. He also won the world title in Argentina in 1982.

Eight years later he won the silver medal with the Soviet team in the 1988 Olympic tournament. In 1989, he was the first Soviet military allowed to play in a foreign country, when he moved to Conad Ravenna in Italy. The following year Panchenko moved to Moka Rica Forlì, where he remained until ending his career in 1994.

External links
 profile

1959 births
Living people
Sportspeople from Kyiv
Ukrainian men's volleyball players
Soviet men's volleyball players
Olympic volleyball players of the Soviet Union
Volleyball players at the 1980 Summer Olympics
Volleyball players at the 1988 Summer Olympics
Olympic gold medalists for the Soviet Union
Olympic silver medalists for the Soviet Union
Olympic medalists in volleyball
Medalists at the 1988 Summer Olympics
Medalists at the 1980 Summer Olympics
Competitors at the 1986 Goodwill Games
Goodwill Games medalists in volleyball